The 1891 All-Ireland Senior Football Championship was the fifth staging of Ireland's premier Gaelic football knock-out competition. Dublin were the champions ending Cork's spell.

Representative clubs

From 1887 until 1891 the club champions represented the whole county.

Results

Connacht Championship
There were no entrants from Connacht.

Munster Championship

Leinster Championship

Ulster Championship

Game was replayed due to an objection.

All-Ireland Championship

Championship statistics

Miscellaneous
 Dublin win both their first Leinster and All Ireland titles.
 Cavan win their first Ulster title.
 Dublin played the All-Ireland Semi-Final and the All-Ireland Final on the same day. The 1891 All-Ireland Senior Hurling Championship Final between Kerry and Wexford was played between the two football matches.

References